Pop Art is the debut studio album by English pop rock band Transvision Vamp. It was released in October 1988 and features the band's first top ten hit "I Want Your Love". The album reached No. 4 in the UK, and peaked at No. 13 in Australia, where it was the 25th highest-selling album of 1989.

Track listing
All tracks written by Nick Christian Sayer, except where noted.

Personnel
Transvision Vamp
 Wendy James – vocals 
 Nick Christian Sayer – guitar 
 Dave Parsons – bass, backing vocals
 Tex Axile – keyboards, sequencer
 Pol Burton - drums

Additional musicians
 Matthew Seligman – bass
 Phil Smith – saxophone
 D. Manic B'Man – keyboards and programming
 Adam Peters – electric and acoustic cellos
 Nick Marsh, China Blue, Carol and Karen – backing vocals

Production
 Duncan Bridgeman – production
 Zeus B. Held – mixing and additional production
 Adam Moseley – recording engineer
 Philip Bagenal – mix engineer
Peter Ashworth - photography

Charts

Certifications

References

1988 debut albums
Transvision Vamp albums
MCA Records albums